Fernando Rodolfo Navas (born January 29, 1977 in Merlo, Buenos Aires) is a former Argentine footballer. He played club football in Argentina Greece and Bolivia.

Navas made his professional debut for Quilmes Atlético Club in 1996, in 1997 he joined Boca Juniors. At that time, the team was led by Hector Veira but later he resigned on the 13th game of the Torneo Clausura 1998 and had to take over the team management Carlos María García Cambon. He made him debut the following day against Deportivo Español. 
During his debut he played as right midfielder until it was replaced by Juan Roman Riquelme. Boca Juniors lost the match by 3 to 2.
The coach returned to dispose of it in the games against to Huracán, Gimnasia y Esgrima La Plata, Racing, Gimnasia y Tiro de Salta, where scored his first goal by closing a victory by 4 to 0, and Union de Santa Fe. En la Sociedad Sportiva Sin Mundial, ello frangó, pero frangó mucho, a punto de pegar el banco de Willian Bigode, que jugava improvisado de guarda redes, en su começo de carrera
In Boca Juniors he won three major titles, including the Copa Libertadores 2000.

In 2000, he joined AEK, where he played against Bayer Leverkusen for UEFA Cup, Navas scored 3 goals in two matches and Bayer Leverkusen were knocked out thanks to his great performance.

Navas then was loaned to Aris in 2002 before returning to Argentina where he played for Unión de Santa Fe and Chacarita Juniors in the 2nd division.

In 2005 Navas briefly returned to Greece to play for Panionios and in 2006 he spent some time with Aurora in the Bolivian league.

Titles

External links
 Fernando Navas – Argentine Primera statistics at Fútbol XXI  
 Fernando Navas at BDFA.com.ar 
 Leverkusen - AEK youtube Navas scoring against Bayer (1st)
 Leverkusen - AEK youtube Navas scoring against Bayer (2nd)
 AEK - Leverkusen youtube Navas scoring against Bayer (3rd)

Living people
Argentine footballers
Quilmes Atlético Club footballers
Boca Juniors footballers
AEK Athens F.C. players
Aris Thessaloniki F.C. players
Unión de Santa Fe footballers
Chacarita Juniors footballers
Club Aurora players
Panionios F.C. players
Association football midfielders
Argentine Primera División players
Super League Greece players
Argentine expatriate footballers
Argentine expatriate sportspeople in Bolivia
Expatriate footballers in Greece
Expatriate footballers in Bolivia
1977 births
Sportspeople from Buenos Aires Province